Annika Nessvold  (born 24 February 1971) is a former Swedish football defender. She was part of the Sweden women's national football team. She competed at the 1996 Summer Olympics, playing three matches. At the club level Nessvold played for Malmö FF.

See also
 Sweden at the 1996 Summer Olympics

References

External links
 
http://www.soccerpunter.com/players/292435-Annika-Nessvold

 
 
http://www.socceramerica.com/article/16087/usa-olympic-womens-update-usa-2-sweden-1-65th-m.html

1971 births
Living people
Swedish women's footballers
Place of birth missing (living people)
Footballers at the 1996 Summer Olympics
Olympic footballers of Sweden
Women's association football defenders
Sweden women's international footballers
1995 FIFA Women's World Cup players
People from Jönköping Municipality
Sportspeople from Jönköping County